The Portsmouth Aerocar was a British light utility aircraft design of the late 1940s.
It was intended to be an aircraft that could be used for a variety of tasks including transport "mobile office" but only one prototype was built being scrapped in 1950.

Design and development
The Aerocar was a high-wing monoplane with gondola fuselage and twin-boom tailplane and tricycle undercarriage. The cabin could hold five passengers in addition to the pilot. Four doors were fitted to the cabin.

It was of composite construction; fabric-covered wooden wings, tail booms and tail fitted to a metal fuselage but the production model would have been all-metal. Clamshell doors at the rear of the fuselage were advertised.

Construction of both a Major and Minor variants was started but the company decided that the Minor would not have enough power and construction was abandoned. The Major prototype was completed and started taxying trials at Portsmouth on 18 June 1947, Frank Luxmoore was pleased with the trials so he undertook the maiden flight the same day.

It was exhibited at the Society of British Aircraft Constructors airshow but funding for the development of the Aerocar was dependent on an agreement for licence manufacture in India. With the uncertainty arising from the partition of India in 1947, this became unlikely and Portsmouth Aviation was unable to continue with development. With Lionel Balfour, the driving force behind the Aerocar, no longer part of the company the Aerocar was stored until scrapped.

To support planned production in India the uncompleted Minor was sent to act as a pattern aircraft, the Indian financial backers failed to support the project and the idea of production in India was abandoned.

Variants
Aerocar Major
Powered by two 155hp Cirrus Major engines and a retractable landing gear, one prototype built and flown.
Aerocar Minor
Planned variant powered by two  Cirrus Minor II engines and a retractable landing gear, construction of a prototype abandoned and moved to India to act as a pattern aircraft for local production.
Aerocar Senior
Proposed variant of the Major with a fixed landing gear and lower level of equipment fit.
Aerocar Junior
Proposed variant of the Minor with a fixed landing gear and a lower level of equipment fit.

Specifications (Aerocar Major)

See also

References

Aerocar
1940s British civil utility aircraft
High-wing aircraft
Twin-boom aircraft
Aircraft first flown in 1947
Twin piston-engined tractor aircraft